This is a list of listed buildings in the town of Newton Stewart, in Dumfries and Galloway,  Scotland.

List 

|}

Key

Notes

References
 All entries, addresses and coordinates are based on data from Historic Scotland. This data falls under the Open Government Licence

Newton Stewart
Newton Stewart